The 1981–82 County Championship was the 40th season of the Liga IV, the fourth tier of the Romanian football league system. The champions of each county association play against one from a neighboring county in a play-off  to gain promotion to Divizia C.

Promotion play-off 
Teams promoted to Divizia C without a play-off matches as teams from less represented counties in the third division.

 (SB) Inter Sibiu
 (SJ) Minerul Sărmășag
 (GJ) Petrolul Țicleni
 (VS) FEPA 74 Bârlad

 (BR) Laminorul Brăila
 (GR) Petrolul Bolintin-Vale
 (CV) Constructorul Sfântu Gheorghe

 Ilfov County did not enter a team in the play-offs.

The matches was played on 5 and 12 July 1981.

County leagues

Arad County 
Seria A

Seria B

Championship final 
The matches was played on 4 and 8 June 1980.

Frontiera Curtici won the 1981–82 Arad County Championship and qualify for promotion play-off in Divizia C.

Botoșani County

Hunedoara County

See also 

 1981–82 Divizia A
 1981–82 Divizia B
 1981–82 Divizia C
 1981–82 Cupa României

References

External links
 

Liga IV seasons
4
Romania